Labeobarbus wittei is a species of ray-finned fish in the genus Labeobarbus endemic to the Lufira River in the Democratic Republic of the Congo.

References

wittei
Fish described in 1973
Endemic fauna of the Democratic Republic of the Congo